A viewing instrument is a type of optical instrument that is used to assist viewing or visually examining an object or scenery

Types

 binoculars
 contact lenses
 cystoscope
 electrotachyscope
 endoscope
 eyeglasses
 fibrescope
 finderscope
 fluoroscope
 gastroscope
 gonioscope
 kaleidoscope
 kinetoscope
 laryngoscope
 magnifying glass
 microscope
 ophthalmoscope
 otoscope
 periscope
 phenakistoscope also phenakistiscope
 praxinoscope
 Rotoscope
 spectroscope
 spotting scope
 stereoscope
 stroboscope
 tachistoscope
 telescope
 teleidoscope
 viewfinder

Optical instruments